The 2012–13 Gil Vicente F.C. season was the club's 80th competitive season, 16th in the Primeira Liga, and 88th year in existence as a football club.

As well as competing in the Primeira Liga, Gil Vicente took part in the Taça de Portugal and the Taça da Liga entering at the third and second rounds respectively. They were eliminated in the quarter-finals of the Taça de Portugal following a 2–1 away defeat by Paços de Ferreira. The Gilistas were eliminated in the second round of the Taça da Liga following a 3–2 aggregate loss by Naval 1º de Maio. Gil Vicente finished in 13th place in the league.

Key events

[[File:Luis Carlos 2014.jpg|thumb|right|200px|Luís Carlos scored the Gilistas first goal of the 2012–13 league season.]]

July
 15: Gil Vicente begin their pre-season campaign with a 1–0 loss to Marítimo. A 13th-minute strike from Olberdam sealed the Madeiran side's victory.
 18: Gil Vicente claim their first victory of pre-season, after 2–0 win over Penafiel. Cláudio, and Pecks scored the Gilistas goals.
 21: Os Galos draw their third game of their pre-season campaign after a 1–1 tie at the hands of Sporting da Covilhã.
 25: Gil Vicente draw their second consecutive game of their pre-season campaign after a 0–0 draw at the hands of Moreirense.
 28: In a pre-season tournament organised by Gil Vicente's shirt sponsor Crédito Agrícola, Benfica defeat the Gilistas 5–2 to win the first annual Crédito Agrícola Cup. Cláudio and Pedro Pereira scored Gil Vicente's goals.

August
 13: Gil Vicente announce the signing of Brazilian full-back Luciano Amaral from Brazilian side Treze.
 14: After impressing during the pre-season, Gil Vicente's chairman António Fiúsa announces that the club have renewed Cape Verdean central defender Pecks' contract by extending his stay with the Gilistas until the end of the 2016–17 season, and increasing Pecks' buyout clause to €10 million.
 15: Ghanaian midfielder William Tiero joins the Gilistas from Saudi club Al-Qadisiyah.
 19: Gil Vicente open their 2012–13 league campaign with a 0–0 draw at home to league champions Porto.
 26: Gil Vicente draw their second consecutive game of the season, by finishing goalless against Marítimo.
 29: Gil Vicente draws second division side Naval 1º de Maio in the second round of the Taça da Liga.

September
 2: Gil Vicente draw their third consecutive game of the season against Vitória de Setúbal.
 9: Gil Vicente draw their first leg Taça da Liga tie against Naval 1º de Maio. The Navalistas opened the scoring on 54 minutes through André Carvalhas. Brito equalized ten minutes later to tie the game.
 24: Gil Vicente suffer their first loss of the season, away to Sporting CP. The Gilistas opened the scoring on seven minutes through Brazilian winger Luís Carlos. Sporting CP equalized on 74 minutes through Diego Capel, and took the lead five minutes from the end through Dutch center-forward Ricky van Wolfswinkel to claim a 2–1 win.
 30: Gil Vicente win their first league game of the season in an enthralling 4–3 victory over newly promoted Moreirense. Moreirense had twice taken the lead in the first half, but the Gilistas clawed back to tie the game before half time through an André Cunha brace, and a spot kick from Brazilian central defender Cláudio. The game's winning goal came 12 minutes from time, as a Cláudio free kick found an on rushing Halisson who headed past Ricardo Ribeiro to secure Gil Vicente's first league win of the season.

October
 7: Gil Vicente win their first away game of the season with a 1–0 victory against Nacional. This was their first win at the Estádio da Madeira since 2002.
 13: Gil Vicente are eliminated from the Taça da Liga after suffering a 2–1 home defeat at the hands of Naval 1º de Maio. Cape Verdean forward Brito opened the scoring for the Gilistas, before João Pedro equalized for the visitors. The winning goal of the game, came before the interval through center forward Tozé Marreco.
 20: Extra-time goals from Cláudio and Ramazotti see Gil Vicente defeat third division side Gondomar in the third round of the Taça de Portugal.
 27: Benfica inflict on Gil Vicente their second loss of the season after a 3–0 victory over the Barcelos side.

November
 3: Gil Vicente are defeated by Minho rivals Braga, 3–1. Former player Zé Luís opened the scoring for the Arsenalistas. Kalidou Yéro equalized in the second half, before Alan's penalty and Hugo Viana's 89th-minute strike sealed Braga's victory.
 9: Paços de Ferreira inflict on Gil Vicente a third consecutive loss. Vitorino Antunes' 45th-minute strike sees Gil Vicente slump to 11th in the table.
 25: Gil Vicente extend their winless run to four after suffering a late equalizer at the hands of Académica de Coimbra. In a game taking place at the Estádio Cidade de Coimbra, the Estudantes opened the scoring on 49 minutes through Flávio Ferreira. The Gilistas equalized on 68 minutes through Pio, before Cláudio put Gil Vicente in front for the first time in the game on 73 minutes. With the game drawing to a close, Académica equalized through Edinho to earn the home side a point.

December
 2: The Gilistas progress to the quarter-finals of the Taça de Portugal after claiming a 1–0 victory over Segunda Liga side Oliveirense. Kalidou Yéro's 30th-minute strike was the difference maker which set up a quarter-final tie against Paços de Ferreira.

January
 9: Gil Vicente announce the signing of Benfica full-back Luís Martins.
 13: Rio Ave inflict on Gil Vicente their sixth loss of the league season. Gil Vicente's defeat extended their winless run to twelve.
 18: Os Galos announce the signings of Portuguese midfielder Paulo Jorge, and Argentine striker Gabriel Rodríguez. Paulo Jorge returned to Portugal after a two-year stint with Saudi side Al-Ittihad, whereas Gabriel Rodríguez joined the Barcelos side from Chilean side Audax Italiano.
 20: The Gilistas record their second away victory of the season and win their first game in thirteen matches after defeating Estoril at the Estádio António Coimbra da Mota. Luís Leal opened the scoring for the Canarinhos on 16 minutes. Cláudio equalized from the penalty spot 11 minutes later. Luís Carlos sealed Gil Vicente's victory seven minutes from time to claim their first victory in three months.
 22: After failing to establish himself at Benfica, Hugo Vieira rejoins Gil Vicente on loan until the end of the season.
 28: Paulo Alves' side suffer a heavy away defeat at the hands of Porto. Gil Vicente's defeat sees them fall one place in the table to 12th.

February
 3: The Galos win their fourth league match of the season, against Marítimo, with goals from João Vilela, Luís Carlos and Hugo Vieira. The win places Gil Vicente into 11th position in the league table.

May
 19: Despite suffering a 3–1 home defeat to Estoril on the final day of the Primeira Liga season, the Gilistas narrowly avoid relegation to the Segunda Liga after Moreirense's away defeat to Benfica ensured Gil Vicente's stay in the Primeira Liga for another season. The club finished in 13th place.
 21''': Two days after avoiding relegation to the Segunda Liga, Gil Vicente chairman António Fiúza announces that the club has parted ways with manager Paulo Alves.

Club
Coaching staff
{|class="wikitable"
|-
!Position
!Staff
|-
|Manager|| Paulo Alves
|-
|Assistant Manager|| Pedro Pinto
|-
|Technical Director|| Lim Costa
|-
|Goalkeeper Coach|| Fernando Baptista
|-
|Fitness Coach|| Ricardo Vaz
|-
|rowspan="2"|Physio|| Frederico Neto
|-
| Lino Silva
|-
|rowspan="2"|Scout|| Alberto Silva
|-
| Daniel Pacheco
|-
|Medical Director|| José Albino
|-
|Kit man|| Luís Figo
|-
|Head of Youth Development|| Carlos Celso
|-Other information

First team squadStats as of the end of the 2012–13 season. Games played and goals scored only refers to appearances and goals in domestic league campaigns.Transfers

In
Summer

Winter

Out
Summer

Winter

Source:

Pre-season and friendlies

Legend

Matches

Competitions

Legend

Overall

Competition record

Primeira Liga

League table

Matches

Taça de Portugal

Matches

Taça da Liga

Matches

Second round

Statistics
Appearances

Top scorersThe list is sorted by shirt number when total goals are equal.Clean sheetsThe list is sorted by shirt number when total appearances are equal.''

Summary

References

Gil Vicente F.C. seasons
Gil Vicente